Pfadfinder (English: "Pathfinder") was a "wolfpack" of German U-boats that operated from 21 to 27 May 1942, in the Battle of the Atlantic during World War II.

U-boats, commanders and dates
 , Friedrich-Hermann Praetorius, 21–27 May
 , Amelung von Varendorff, 21–27 May
 , Heinz-Otto Schultze, 21–27 May
 , Hans-Heinrich Giessler, 21–27 May
 , Dietrich Borchert, 21–27 May
 , Ernst-August Rehwinkel, 21–27 May
 , Gerhard Feiler, 21–27 May
 , Otto von Bülow, 23–27 May

Ships hit by this Wolfpack

Zurichmoor
At 00:24 on 23 May, while en route from Halifax to Saint Thomas, U.S. Virgin Islands, the unescorted 4,455 GRT British merchant ship Zurichmoor was torpedoed and sunk by U-432 east of Philadelphia. The master, 38 crewmen, and six gunners were lost.

Polyphemus
The U-boat surfaced and questioned the first officer before giving them cigarettes and the heading for New York. Three of the lifeboats landed at Nantucket Island, Massachusetts, while the other two were rescued by a Portuguese ship.

References

Wolfpacks of 1942